Byron Wright "By" Dickson (March 18, 1875 – May 22, 1930) was an American football player and coach of football, basketball, and baseball. He served as the head football coach at Colby College (1898), Gettysburg College (1900), the University of South Carolina (1901), Lehigh University (1906–1909), Bucknell University (1910–1913), and Franklin & Marshall (1919). Dickson was also the head baseball coach at Lehigh (1909–1910), Bucknell (1911–1913), and Franklin & Marshall (1920), amassing a career college baseball record of 45–53. In addition, he served as the head basketball coach at Franklin & Marshall during the 1919–20 season, tallying a mark of 7–6.

Dickson was born in Germantown, Pennsylvania. He played college football at the University of Pennsylvania from 1895 to 1897 as an end. In 1899, Dickson played professional football for the Duquesne Country and Athletic Club. He died on May 22, 1930 in Miami Beach, Florida.

Coaching career
Dickson began his coaching career in 1898 when he was hired as the football coach at Colby College in Waterville, Maine.

Head coaching record

Football

References

1875 births
1930 deaths
19th-century players of American football
American football ends
Basketball coaches from Pennsylvania
Bucknell Bison baseball coaches
Bucknell Bison football coaches
Colby Mules football coaches
Duquesne Country and Athletic Club players
Franklin & Marshall Diplomats baseball coaches
Franklin & Marshall Diplomats football coaches
Franklin & Marshall Diplomats men's basketball coaches
Lehigh Mountain Hawks baseball coaches
Gettysburg Bullets football coaches
Lehigh Mountain Hawks football coaches
Penn Quakers football coaches
Penn Quakers football players
South Carolina Gamecocks athletic directors
South Carolina Gamecocks football coaches
Players of American football from Philadelphia